Pierre is a closed French cuisine restaurant which was situated on the 25th floor of the Mandarin Oriental hotel in Hong Kong. It opened in October 2006 after a major renovation to the hotel and was Pierre Gagnaire’s pied-à-terre in Hong Kong. It replaced Vong's (1997–2005), which replaced Pierrot (1979–1997), a classic French restaurant. After 14 years in service, Pierre closed on 31 July 2020.

Accolades
The restaurant received two star in the Michelin Guide's Hong Kong and Macau edition.

References

External links
 Official site

Restaurants in Hong Kong
Defunct restaurants
Defunct French restaurants